The 2022 European Shotgun Championships was the 52nd edition of the global shotgun competition, European Shotgun Championships, organised by the European Shooting Confederation.

The championships also served as first qualification event for 2024 Summer Olympics.

Men

Women

Mixed

Medal table

Juniors

Seniors

Olympic quotas

References

External links
 
 https://results.sius.com/Events.aspx?Championship=7b6d5fa7-8f85-4592-912e-65b74a47962b
 https://www.the-sports.org/shooting-sports-european-junior-shotgun-championships-results-2022-mixed-epi125066.html
 https://www.the-sports.org/shooting-sports-european-junior-shotgun-championships-results-2022-men-epm125066.html
 https://www.the-sports.org/shooting-sports-european-junior-shotgun-championships-results-2022-women-epf125066.html

European Shooting Championships
European Shotgun Championships
2022 in Cypriot sport
European Shotgun Championships
European Shotgun Championships
International sports competitions hosted by Cyprus